Marhi Da Deeva may refer to:
 Marhi Da Deeva (novel), a 1964 Punjabi novel by Gurdial Singh
 Marhi Da Deeva (film), a 1989 Indian Punjabi-language film, based on the novel